Davido Music Worldwide (commonly known as DMW), is a Nigerian record label owned by Afrobeats singer Davido. The label is home to recording acts, such as Dremo, Yonda, Peruzzi, Idowest from Lagos Island, DJ Ecool, Danagog, B-Red, Deekay, May D, Deinde, Ayanfe, and Liya. It also houses producers Fresh vdm and Speroach Beatz. Artists affiliated and formerly signed to the label, include Ichaba, Lola Rae, Lil Frosh, and Mayorkun.

History
On 18 April 2016, Davido founded Davido Music Worldwide, following his exit from HKN Music with his music acts Mayorkun, and Dremo over an issue with his cousin B-Red, for hating on him over the success of Mayorkun. On 29 September 2016, Ichaba signed a joint venture between Davido Music Worldwide, and APPE Music Entertainment. On 5 November 2016, Davido signed Lola Rae to DMW, as its first lady. On 20 January 2017, Davido signed Yonda, and also welcomed Peruzzi on 16 November 2017 to DMW. On 24 May 2018, Davido signed Idowest to DMW, and Deekay was welcomed on 27 September 2018, with a single "Hangover" featuring Peruzzi. On 26 October 2019, Davido signed Lil Frosh to DMW. On 15 January 2020, Davido signed Ayanfe to DMW, and Davido welcomed B-Red on 22 February 2020 to DMW. On 18 July 2020, Davido signed May D to DMW. On 27 September 2020, Deinde joined DMW artist roaster, following his deal with DMW. On 2 October 2020, Davido signed Liya, his first female artist to DMW. Same day, Lola Rae, tweeted "Excited to hear Davido is signing a new female artist!!! This is amazing amazing news! I was never signed to Davido; he was just incredibly kind enough to help push & promote an upcoming artist aka myself! God bless him forever for that so grateful".

In 2018, DJ Ecool, who also serves as Davido official disc jockey, became a member of Davido Music Worldwide.

Departures

Ichaba
On 1 November 2019, he uncovered his record deal with DMW, according to him on Catch Up, he tells City 105.1 FM, "I was about to get signed to them at some point but, there were some little distractions on my end. Presently it just like I’m signed because I get all the perks of a signed artist. I don’t have plans to get signed to another record label".

Lola Rae
On 2 October 2020, Lola Rae, tweeted she was never signed to DMW, but she is forever grateful to Davido.

Lil Frosh and allegations of domestic violence
On 6 October 2020, Davido terminated Lil Frosh contract with DMW, over an allegations of domestic violence by his girlfriend Gift Camille, which went viral on Monday, 5 October.

Mayorkun
In 2021, Mayorkun announce his exit from DMW with a release of his single "Let Me Know" off his second album "Back In Office", released through Sony Music West Africa.

Accolades
DMW won Record Label of the Year at The Beatz Awards 2019, and City People Music Awards 2017/2018, and was nominated at City People Music Awards 2016.

Roster

Current acts

Former acts

Producers
Speroach Beatz
Napji
Magicboi
Fresh VDM

DJ's
DJ Ecool

Discography

Albums/Mixtape/EP

References 

Nigerian record labels
Pop record labels
Record labels established in 2016